Weinsheim is a municipality in the district of Bitburg-Prüm, in Rhineland-Palatinate, western Germany.

Geography 
Weinsheim lies in the West Eifel, on the northwestern edge of the Prüm syncline. 

The municipality is divided into four parishes (population as at 2014):

References

Bitburg-Prüm